The 1936 season was the Hawthorn Football Club's 12th season in the Victorian Football League and 35th overall.

Fixture

Premiership Season

Ladder

References

Hawthorn Football Club seasons